Kim Kwang-hoon  (born on February 20, 1961) is a former South Korean footballer.

He graduated at Hanyang University, and played for Lucky-Goldstar Hwangso, where he was the first club's captain.

Club career 
1983 Yukong Elephants
1984–1985 Lucky-Goldstar Hwangso

Honours

Player
 Lucky-Goldstar Hwangso
 K-League Winner (1): 1985

Individual

References
 

1961 births
Living people
K League 1 players
Korea National League players
Jeju United FC players
FC Seoul players
South Korean footballers

Association football midfielders